Vladimir Tsankov Yonkov (born 19 July 1973 in Pleven) is a Bulgarian retired football defensive midfielder.

Club Playing Honours
Levski Sofia
 A PFG: runner-up 1995–96, 1997–98
 Bulgarian Cup: 1998

External links 

 Profile at LevskiSofia.info

1973 births
Living people
Sportspeople from Pleven
Bulgarian footballers
Bulgaria international footballers
PFC Slavia Sofia players
FC Hebar Pazardzhik players
PFC Levski Sofia players
FC Lokomotiv 1929 Sofia players
SpVgg Greuther Fürth players
PFC Marek Dupnitsa players
PFC Kaliakra Kavarna players
PFC Spartak Pleven players
Akademik Sofia players
First Professional Football League (Bulgaria) players
2. Bundesliga players
Bulgarian expatriate footballers
Expatriate footballers in Germany
Association football midfielders